The 1957 Sangchal earthquake struck northern Iran's Mazandaran province on 2 July 1957. It devastated many communities in the Alborz Mountains and caused an estimated 1,500 fatalities. Damage was estimated at US$ 25 milion.

Tectonic setting
Crustal deformation is dictated by the /yr oblique-convergence between the two tectonic plates. Deformation is accommodated by reverse and strike-slip faulting. In northern and southern Iran, thrusting allows convergence through crustal thickening to take place. Most of the convergence is accommodated along fold and thrust belts of the Zagros, Alborz, Kopet Dag mountains, and in eastern Iran, where seismicity is high. Seismicity in the central plateau is low due to its geology consisting of rigid and aseismic tectonic blocks.

Earthquake

The earthquake was the result of shallow thrust faulting along the Larzaneh Fault, a shallow south-dipping thrust fault in the Alborz Mountains. The mainshock ruptured across a  ×  area. It is the second largest instrumentally recorded earthquake in the mountains, behind the 1990 Manjil–Rudbar earthquake. The earthquake beneath the mountains occurred in a region of northwest–southeast trending reverse faults; near the interconnection of two antithetic reverse faults where the western Larzaneh Fault terminates. The fault links to another thrust fault via a linkage fault dipping southwest and extending to the northwest.

No coseismic surface faulting was associated with the earthquake and there were no anomalies in fumarolic activity on Mount Damavand despite its epicenter within  of the volcano. However, some fault movement was observed along the Amir Fault Zone, a south-dipping reverse fault. Fresh cracks were reported along a road that crosses the fault after the earthquake. There were unconfirmed reports of large fissures measuring several kilometers long in the mountainous area, north of Sang Chal. Nicholas Ambraseys also documented  of surface faulting which were not coseismic. These cracks were explained as triggered landslides or other natural events other than faulting.

Impact
The meizoseismal area was located between the Haraz and Talar rivers; encompassing the dehestans of Band Pay, Beh, Dala Rustaq and Chalav. There, around 120 villages were levelled and 1,500 deaths were recorded. The villages of Sang Chal, Nandal, Chaliyasar, Nasal, Andavar and Pardimeh were the hardest-hit. In Burun, Varzaneh, Shanguldeh, Nal and Dinan, rockfalls and landslides caused further devastation. There were few engineering infrastructures in the region; the only reported damage was along Haraz road, which was minimal. The lining of a tunnel linking Kuhrud and Bayjan was severely cracked and its haunch sheared. Minor damage was observed at a tunnel near Nur and on a wooden bridge in Aliabad.

Damage beyond the meizoseismal area was less severe but widespread. The severity of damage decreased more dramatically with distance towards the northwest and southeast compared to the northeast and southwest. Damage was reported as far as Pul-i Safis, Shiragh and to the Kaslian River. At Utu, near the Kaslian River, several homes collapsed. Caved roofs were reported in Polur and Fasham while in Tehran, some homes were damaged. Damage to buildings extended as far southeast as Firuzkuh. To the northwest, at Qaemshahr and Sari, some modern constructions were damaged. An imamzadeh at Vāneh and the Emamzadeh Hashem Shrine were heavily damaged.

See also
 List of earthquakes in 1957
 List of earthquakes in Iran

References

Sources

External links
 

1957 earthquakes
Earthquakes in Iran
1957 in Iran
History of Mazandaran Province
July 1957 events in Asia
History of Amol
Amol County
Buried rupture earthquakes